Nathan Stewart Heffernan (August 6, 1920 – April 13, 2007) was an American lawyer and judge.  He was the 23rd Chief Justice of the Wisconsin Supreme Court from 1983 to 1995.  Earlier in his career he served as United States Attorney for the  during the presidency of John F. Kennedy.

Biography

Early life and education
Heffernan was born in Frederic, Wisconsin. He attended school in Sheboygan, and in 1942 he graduated from the University of Wisconsin–Madison. Heffernan served in the Navy during World War II, and attended the Harvard Graduate School of Business. He then graduated Order of the Coif from the University of Wisconsin Law School in 1948.

Heffernan and his wife, Dorothy Hillemann, had three children.

Career
Heffernan worked in a private law practice in Sheboygan at the firm of Buchen & Heffernan from 1948 to 1959. During this time he served as the Assistant District Attorney for Sheboygan County from 1951 to 1953, and as the City Attorney of Sheboygan from 1953 to 1959. At that time, Heffernan resigned his duties from his law firm and became Deputy Attorney General of Wisconsin, and remained in that position until 1962 when he was appointed as a United States Attorney for the Western District of Wisconsin by President John F. Kennedy.

In 1964, Wisconsin Governor John W. Reynolds appointed Heffernan to the Wisconsin Supreme Court. He became Chief Justice of that court in 1983, and retired in 1995. The 31 years that Heffernan spent on the Supreme Court make him the third longest-serving judge in Wisconsin history. During his time on the Supreme Court Heffernan was well known for his commitment to civil liberties and women's rights and was recognized for his involvement in the court reorganization of 1978, which created a Wisconsin Court of Appeals.

Heffernan taught summer courses on appellate administration and opinion writing at New York University School of Law and was an adjunct professor of appellate practice and procedure at the University of Wisconsin Law School for fifteen years.

Notes

1920 births
2007 deaths
People from Frederic, Wisconsin
University of Wisconsin–Madison alumni
University of Wisconsin Law School alumni
Harvard Business School alumni
Chief Justices of the Wisconsin Supreme Court
20th-century American judges
United States Navy personnel of World War II